Maneck Ardeshir Sohrab Dalal OBE (24 December 1918 – 6 March 2017) was a manager in the early days of Tata Airlines and Air India. He was civil aviation attaché for the Indian High Commission in London and a Parsi. After he retired from Air India in 1977 he became managing director of Tata Ltd in the United Kingdom. He was chairman of the Bharatiya Vidya Bhavan in London.

References

1918 births
2017 deaths
Alumni of Trinity Hall, Cambridge
Tata Group people
Air India
Businesspeople from Mumbai
Officers of the Order of the British Empire